Picard is an unorganized territory in the Canadian province of Quebec, located in the Kamouraska Regional County Municipality. The territory consists of two non-contiguous areas.

See also
 West Branch Little Black River (Quebec–Maine), a stream
 West Branch Pocwock Stream, a stream

References

Incorporated places in Bas-Saint-Laurent